Alexandre Berthoud (born 29 June 1977) is a Swiss politician and a member of the Grand Council of Vaud elected in 2012. He chaired the council’s Finance Committee for five years (2015–2020). He is vice president of the PLR Vaud since 2018. Berthoud is president of Economic Commission and a member of board of directors of LEB.

References

External links 
 

1977 births
Living people
Swiss politicians
Canton of Vaud politicians
FDP.The Liberals politicians